The Alcaic stanza is a Greek lyrical meter, an Aeolic verse form traditionally believed to have been invented by Alcaeus, a lyric poet from Mytilene on the island of Lesbos, about 600 BC. The Alcaic stanza and the Sapphic stanza named for Alcaeus' contemporary, Sappho, are two important forms of Classical poetry. The Alcaic stanza consists of two Alcaic hendecasyllables, followed by an Alcaic enneasyllable and an Alcaic decasyllable.

In Sappho's and Alcaeus' poetry
The Alcaic stanza as used by Sappho and Alcaeus has the scheme ( where "–" is a longum, "u" a breve, and "×" an anceps):
 × – u – × – u u – u – || (alc11)
 × – u – × – u u – u – || (alc11)
 × – u – × – u – – ||     (alc9 )
 – u u – u u – u – – |||  (alc10)

In Latin poetry
One stanza consists of four lines; the first two lines are divided into two parts by a caesura after the fifth syllable.  The metrical pattern of an Alcaic stanza would look like this:

 – – u – – : – u u – u –
 – – u – – : – u u – u –
 – – u – – – u – –
 – u u – u u – u – –

(An "–" denotes a long syllable, "u" a short one, and ":" is the caesura.)

Horace frequently used the Alcaic stanza in his Odes, as can be seen from this example :

 –    –   u –    –  – u u   – u –
 Antehac nefas, depromere Caecubum
  –  –  u – –  : –   u u – u–
 cellis avitis, dum Capitolio
  – – u  – –  –   u– –
 Regina dementis ruinas
  – u  u  –  u u–  u – –
 funus et Imperio parabat. (Odes 1.37, lines 5-8)

An English translation, which suggests the metre, is :

   ––   u   –      –  : –  u u   –   u  –
 Prior to this, 'twas | irreligious to waste
 –    –  u –   –   :   –      u    u  – u –
 Old Caecuban wine | whilst, for the Capitol
  –   –u –  –    –     u   –    –
 Mad ruination plots the Queen, and
 – u  u  – u u   –   u  –  –
 Even a funeral for the Empire.

Imitations in other languages
A famous example of English Alcaics is Tennyson's "Milton":

O mighty-mouth'd inventor of harmonies,
O skill'd to sing of Time or Eternity,
     God-gifted organ-voice of England,
          Milton, a name to resound for ages!

The Alcaic stanza was adapted to use in English and French during the Renaissance. It was very frequently used in Italian poetry of the 19th century, especially by Giosuè Carducci. As in English, the meter is accentual rather than quantitative.

Poi che un sereno vapor d’ambrosia
da la tua còppa diffuso avvolsemi,
     o Ebe con passo di dea
          trasvolata sorridendo via;
(Giosuè Carducci, "Ideale", from: Odi barbare)

It was an historically important form in Hungarian poetry. In Polish poetry (in contrast to the Sapphic stanza which was extremely popular since the 16th century) Alcaics were used very rarely. Even in translation Horace's Alcaic stanzas were usually turned into different forms. An example (perhaps the only) of an Alcaic stanza in Polish original literature is Stanisław Trembecki's Ode to Adam Naruszewicz:

O ty, kapłanie Delijskiego świętny,
Przeszłego wiadom, przyszłości pojętny
     Wieńcz twe skronie, wieszczą bierz laskę,
          Śnieżny ubiór i złotą przepaskę.

Trembecki's verse is syllabic (11/11/9/10). There is no accentual metrical pattern.

German has also used alcaics with some success. They were introduced by Klopstock, and used by Hölderlin, by Johann Heinrich Voss in his translations of Horace, by August Kopisch and other 19th century German poets.

A notable example of old Alcaic stanza is found in Miquel Costa i Llobera's book "Horacianes", written in Catalan:

Cel i mar lluen blavors diàfanes
en competència. L'oreig anima-s'hi,
     i jugant amb les ones qui juguen,
rompre les fa com en rialla fresca.

Notes

Stanzaic form